William Wolfe was a leader of the Scottish National Party.

William Wolfe can also refer to:

Billy Wolfe, wrestling promoter
William F. Wolfe, US politician

See also
William Wolff (disambiguation)
William Wolf (disambiguation)